Eugene F. Stoermer (March 7, 1934February 17, 2012) was a leading researcher in diatoms, with a special emphasis on freshwater species of the North American Great Lakes. He was a professor of biology at the University of Michigan School of Natural Resources and Environment.

Biography 
His Bachelor of Science degree was obtained in 1958 and his Doctor of Science in 1963, both from Iowa State University. His doctoral thesis was "Post-pleistocene diatoms from Lake West Okoboji, Iowa" 

Stoermer originally coined and used the term Anthropocene from the early 1980s to refer to the impact and evidence for the effects of human activity on the planet earth. The word was not used in general culture until it was popularized in 2000 by Nobel Prize-winning atmospheric chemist Paul Crutzen and others who regard the influence of human behavior on Earth's atmosphere in recent centuries as so significant as to constitute a new geological epoch.

He is the co-author  with   J. P. Smol of The Diatoms Applications for the Environmental and Earth Sciences. Cambridge, UK: Cambridge University Press, 1999. ; According to WorldCat, the book is held in 1262 libraries 

In 2009, he received the honor of a festschrift, Diatom taxonomy, ultrastructure, and ecology : modern methods and timeless questions : a tribute to Eugene F. Stoermer

Named after him 
Diatom genera — Stoermeria J.P. Kociolek, L. Escobar & S. Richardon, 1996.

Diatom species:
 Amphora stoermerii M. Edlund & Z. Levkov, 2009
 Amphorotia stoermeri D.M. Williams & G. Reid, 2006
 Colliculoamphora stoermeri G. Reid & D.M. Williams, 2009
 Encyonema stoermeri S.A. Spaulding, J.R. Pool & S.I. Castro, 2010
 Encyonopsis stoermeri H. Lange-Bertalot & D. Metzeltin, 2009
 Frustulia stoermeri H. Lange-Bertalot & D. Metzeltin, 2009
 Gomphonema stoermeri J.P. Kociolek & J.C. Kingston, 1999
 Gomphosphenia stoermeri J.P. Kociolek & E.W. Thomas, 2009
 Navicula stoermeri J.P. Kociolek & B. de Reviers, 1996
 Neidium stoermeri E.W. Thomas & J.P. Kociolek, 2008
 Pinnularia stoermeri D. Metzeltin & H. Lange-Bertalot, 2007
 Surirella stoermerii R.L. Lowe, 1973

References

External links
 Eugene F. Stoermer (1934—2012) — Obituary, 2012.

American phycologists
American limnologists
American ecologists
1934 births
2012 deaths
University of Michigan faculty